Gigi Does It is an American sitcom that was created by David Krumholtz, Ricky Mabe, Zach Golden, Ben Newmark, and Dan Newmark, with Krumholtz playing a Jewish senior citizen (the title character) who learns she has inherited millions of dollars from her late husband. On April 28, 2015, IFC ordered the series. The series premiered on IFC on October 1, 2015. On December 5, 2015, the series was canceled by IFC.

Cast
David Krumholtz as Gigi
Ricky Mabe as Ricky
Lesley Ann Warren as Tretchy Feinberg

Episodes

Reception
On Rotten Tomatoes, the series has an aggregate score of 29% based on 2 positive and 7 negative critic reviews.

References

External links
 
 
 

2015 American television series debuts
2015 American television series endings
2010s American sitcoms
IFC (American TV channel) original programming